In finance, the beta (β or market beta or beta coefficient)  is a measure of how an individual asset moves (on average) when the overall stock market increases or decreases. Thus, beta is a useful measure of the contribution of an individual asset to the risk of the market portfolio when it is added in small quantity.  Thus, beta is referred to as an asset's non-diversifiable risk, its systematic risk, market risk, or  hedge ratio.  Beta is not a measure of idiosyncratic risk.

Interpretation of values

By definition, the value-weighted average of all market-betas of all investable assets with respect to the value-weighted market index is 1.  If an asset has a beta above (below) 1, it indicates that its return moves more (less) than 1-to-1 with the return of the market-portfolio, on average.  In practice, few stocks have negative betas (tending to go up when the market goes down).  Most stocks have betas between 0 and 3.

Treasury bills (like most fixed income instruments) and commodities tend to have low or zero betas, call options tend to have high betas (even compared to the underlying stock), and put options and short positions and some inverse ETFs tend to have negative betas.

Importance as risk measure

Beta is the hedge ratio of an investment with respect to the stock market.  For example, to hedge out the market-risk of a stock with a market beta of 2.0, an investor would short $2,000 in the stock market for every $1,000 invested in the stock.  Thus insured, movements of the overall stock market no longer influence the combined position on average.

Beta thus measures the contribution of an individual investment to the risk of the market portfolio that was not reduced by diversification. It does not measure the risk when an investment is held on a stand-alone basis.

Technical aspects

Mathematical definition
The market beta  of an asset , observed on  occasions, 
is defined by (and best obtained via) a linear regression of the rate of return  of asset 
on the rate of return  of the (typically value-weighted) stock-market index :

where  is an unbiased error term whose squared error should be minimized. 
The coefficient  is often referred to as the alpha.

The ordinary least squares solution is

Betas with respect to different market indexes are not comparable.

Relationship between own risk and beta risk 
By using the relationship between standard deviation and variance,  and the definition of correlation , market beta can also be written as
,
This equation shows that the idiosyncratic risk is related to but often very different to market beta. If the idiosyncratic risk is 0 (i.e., the stock returns do not move), so is the market-beta. The reverse is not the case: A coin toss bet has a zero beta but not zero risk.

Attempts have been made to estimate the three ingredient components separately, but this has not led to better estimates of market-betas.

Adding an asset to the market portfolio 
Suppose an investor has all his money in the market  and wishes to move a small amount into asset class .  The new portfolio is defined by

The variance can be computed as

Using the definition of  this is

This suggests that an asset with  greater than 1 increases the portfolio variance, while an asset with  less than 1 decreases it if added in a small amount.

Beta as a linear operator 
Market-beta can be weighted, averaged, added, etc.  That is, if a portfolio consists of 80% asset A and 20% asset B, then the beta of the portfolio is 80% times the beta of asset A and 20% times the beta of asset B.

Choice of market portfolio and risk-free rate 

In practice, the choice of index makes relatively little difference in the market betas of individual assets, because broad value-weighted market indexes tend to move closely together.

Academics tend to prefer to work with a value-weighted market portfolio due to its attractive aggregation properties and its close link with the CAPM.  Practitioners tend to prefer to work with the S&P500 due to its easy in-time availability and availability to hedge with stock index futures.

A reasonable argument can be made that the U.S. stock market is too narrow, omitting all sorts of other domestic and international asset classes.  Thus another occasional choice would be the use of international indexes, such as the MSCI EAFE.  However, even these indexes have returns that are surprisingly similar to the stock market.

A benchmark can even be chosen to be similar to the assets chosen by the investor. For example, for a person who owns S&P 500 index funds and gold bars, the index would combine the S&P 500 and the price of gold.  However, the resulting beta would no longer be a market-beta in the typical meaning of the term.

The choice of whether to subtract the risk-free rate (from both own returns and market rates of return) before estimating market-betas is similarly inconsequential.  When this is done, usually one selects an interest rate equivalent to the time interval (i.e., a one-day or one-month Treasury interest rate.)

Empirical estimation

It is important to distinguish between a true market-beta that defines the true expected relationship between the rate of return on assets and the market, and a realized market-beta that is based on historical rates of returns and represents just one specific history out of the set of possible stock return realizations.  The true market-beta could be viewed as the average outcome if infinitely many draws could be observed---but because observing more than one draw is never strictly the case, the true market-beta can never be observed even in retrospect.  Only the realized market-beta can be observed.  However, on average, the best forecast of the realized market-beta is also the best forecast of the true market-beta.

Estimators of market-beta have to wrestle with two important problems:

 The underlying market betas are known to move over time.
 Investors are interested in the best forecast of the true prevailing market-beta most indicative of the most likely future market-beta realization (which will be the realized risk contribution to their portfolios) and not in the historical market-beta.

Despite these problems, a historical beta estimator remains an obvious benchmark predictor. It is obtained as the slope of the fitted line from the linear least-squares estimator.  The OLS regression can be estimated on 1–5 years worth of daily, weekly or monthly stock returns. The choice depends on the trade off between accuracy of beta measurement (longer periodic measurement times and more years give more accurate results) and historic firm beta changes over time (for example, due to changing sales products or clients).

Improved estimators 
Other beta estimators reflect the tendency of betas (like rates of return) for regression toward the mean, induced not only by measurement error but also by underlying changes in the true beta and/or historical randomness.  (Intuitively, one would not suggest a company with high return [e.g., a drug discovery] last year also to have as high a return next year.)  Such estimators include the Blume/Bloomberg beta (used prominently on many financial websites), the Vasicek beta, the Scholes-Williams beta, and the Dimson beta.

 The Blume beta estimates the future beta as 2/3 times the historical OLS beta plus 1/3 times the number 1.  A version based on monthly rates of return is widely distributed by Capital IQ and quoted on all financial websites.  It predicts future market-beta poorly.
 The Vasicek beta varies the weight between the historical OLS beta and the number 1 (or the average market beta if the portfolio is not value-weighted) by the volatility of the stock and the heterogeneity of betas in the overall market.  It can be viewed either as an optimal Bayesian estimator or a random-effects estimator under the (violated) assumption that the underlying market-beta does not move.  It is modestly difficult to implement.  It performs modestly better than the OLS beta.
 The Scholes-Williams and Dimson betas are estimators that account for infrequent trading causing non-synchronously quoted prices.  They are rarely useful when stock prices are quoted at day's end and easily available to analysts (as they are in the US), because they incur an efficiency loss when trades are reasonably synchronous.  However, they can be very useful in cases in which frequent trades are not observed (e.g., as in private equity) or in markets with rare trading activity.

These estimators attempt to uncover the instant prevailing market-beta.  When long-term market-betas are required, further regression toward the mean over long horizons should be considered.

Equilibrium use: fair reward for risk? 

In the idealized capital asset pricing model (CAPM), beta risk is the only kind of risk for which investors should receive an expected return higher than the risk-free rate of interest.  This is discussed in the CAPM article and the Security Market Line article.

When used within the context of the CAPM, beta becomes a measure of the appropriate expected rate of return.  Due to the fact that the overall rate of return on the firm is weighted rate of return on its debt and its equity, the market-beta of the overall unlevered firm is the weighted average of the firm's debt beta (often close to 0) and its levered equity beta.

Use in performance measurement 

In fund management, adjusting for exposure to the market separates out the component that fund managers should have received given that they had their specific exposure to the market.  For example, if the stock market went up by 20% in a given year, and a manager had a portfolio with a market-beta of 2.0, this portfolio should have returned 40% in the absence of specific stock picking skills.  This is measured by the alpha in the market-model, holding beta constant.

Non-market betas

Occasionally, other betas than market-betas are used.  The arbitrage pricing theory (APT) has multiple factors in its model and thus requires multiple betas.  (The CAPM has only one risk factor, namely the overall market, and thus works only with the plain beta.)  For example, a beta with respect to oil price changes would sometimes be called an "oil-beta" rather than "market-beta" to clarify the difference.

Betas commonly quoted in mutual fund analyses often measure the exposure to a specific fund benchmark, rather than to the overall stock market.  Such a beta would measure the risk from adding a specific fund to a holder of the mutual fund benchmark portfolio, rather than the risk of adding the fund to a portfolio of the market.

Special cases

Utility stocks commonly show up as examples of low beta. These have some similarity to bonds, in that they tend to pay consistent dividends, and their prospects are not strongly dependent on economic cycles. They are still stocks, so the market price will be affected by overall stock market trends, even if this does not make sense.

Foreign stocks may provide some diversification. World benchmarks such as S&P Global 100 have slightly lower betas than comparable US-only benchmarks such as S&P 100. However, this effect is not as good as it used to be; the various markets are now fairly correlated, especially the US and Western Europe.

Derivatives are examples of non-linear assets. Beta relies on a linear model. An out of the money option may have a distinctly non-linear payoff. The change in price of an option relative to the change in the price of the underlying asset (for example a stock) is not constant. For example, if one purchased a put option on the S&P 500, the beta would vary as the price of the underlying index (and indeed as volatility, time to expiration and other factors) changed. (see options pricing, and Black–Scholes model).

See also

Alpha (finance)
Betavexity
CSS Theory - Beta
Cost of capital
Financial risk
Hamada's equation
List of financial performance measures
Macro risk
Pure play method
Risk factor (finance)
Treynor ratio
WACC

References

External links
ETFs & Diversification: A Study of Correlations 
Leverage and diversification effects of public companies
Calculate Beta in a Spreadsheet
Free Beta Calculator for any Asset-Index pair
Calculate Sharpe Ratio in Excel
Calculate Beta in Excel
Online Portfolio Beta Calculator

Mathematical finance
Fundamental analysis
Financial ratios
Statistical ratios

ja:資本コスト#β値（ベータ値）